The Women's Downhill in the 2019 FIS Alpine Skiing World Cup involved eight events, including the season finals in Soldeu, Andorra. Defending discipline champion Sofia Goggia of Italy fractured her ankle prior to the start of the season and missed five of the eight events, ending her chances to repeat. In addition, 2018 runner-up Lindsey Vonn of the USA, who had closed the prior season by winning all of the final four downhills and needed only four more victories to equal Ingemar Stenmark's all-time World Cup victory record, began the season injured and announced her planned retirement at the end of the season, but was hampered during her comeback by her cumulative injuries, and finally retired immediately after the conclusion of the 2019 World Ski Championships. 

Among this wide=open field, Austrian skier Nicole Schmidhofer grabbed the lead in the discipline going into the next-to-last race of the season at Crans Montana in Switzerland, where a bizarre timing mishap occurred.  In a race won by Goggia after her return, Schmidhofer was originally announced as placing third in the downhill, but before the podium, the placings were controversially changed and Schmidhofer was demoted to fourth behind Goggia and two Swiss skiers, Joana Hählen and Lara Gut-Behrami. However, three days later, the official standings were again changed as, after a review of the adjustments made due to a timer misplacement, it turned out that four Swiss skiers (including both Hählen and Gut-Behrami) had been given incorrect adjustments, and Schmidhofer was moved up to second, giving her a 90-point lead with one race to go, virtually clinching the discipline championship for the season.  Schmidhofer then secured the title for 2019 at the season finals in Soldeu, Andorra when her nearest rival, fellow Austrian Ramona Siebenhofer, failed to win the race.

The season was interrupted by the 2019 World Ski Championships, which were held from 4–17 February in Åre, Sweden. The women's downhill was held on 10 February.

Standings

DNF = Did Not Finish
DNS = Did Not Start

See also
 2019 Alpine Skiing World Cup – Women's summary rankings
 2019 Alpine Skiing World Cup – Women's Overall
 2019 Alpine Skiing World Cup – Women's Super-G
 2019 Alpine Skiing World Cup – Women's Giant Slalom
 2019 Alpine Skiing World Cup – Women's Slalom
 2019 Alpine Skiing World Cup – Women's Combined

References

External links
 

Women's Downhill
FIS Alpine Ski World Cup women's downhill discipline titles